Xiakou is a town under the administration of Xingshan County, Hubei, China. , it has one residential community and 15 villages under its administration.

References 

Township-level divisions of Hubei
Xingshan County